Law Lan MH (born Lo Yin-ying; 13 November 1934), is a veteran Hong Kong actress in both the film and TV industry.

Career
She first started out in the film industry in 1939, cast in antagonistic roles during the black and white film era. It was during this time that she took the stage name of "Law Lan" based on the advice of her boss because he said the name was reminiscent of Shanghai socialites (交際花), and this name better suited the type of roles that she played.

In 1971, Law Lan joined TVB and took part in numerous drama series. Here, she played a variety of different characters instead of only being cast in antagonistic roles as she had previously. She also took part in the popular nightly variety show, Enjoy Yourself Tonight, which included skits, singing, dancing, and variety games, filmed in front of a live audience.

As well, Law Lan has been popularly cast playing roles as a supernatural medium in over 36 Hong Kong horror movies, despite the fact that she is a devout Roman Catholic. It was her performance as 四婆 (which is fourth granny literally) in the movie, Bullets Over Summer, which garnered her the "Best Actress" award at the 19th Hong Kong Film Award in 2000, making her the oldest winner of this coveted award.

Personal life
Law's father died during World War II aged 34 after complications from opium withdrawals. She has been living alone since 1994 when her Indian mother died, thus saving her from immigrating to Canada.

Filmography

Television dramas

Film
The Kid (1950)
Story of the White-Haired Demon Girl (1959)
Les Belles (1961)
Young, Pregnant and Unmarried (1968)
Lucky Seven (1970)
The House of 72 Tenants (1972)
Police Woman (1973)
Games Gamblers Play (1974)
Aces Go Places 3 (1984)
The Greatest Lover (1988)
The Bride with White Hair 2 (1993)
Troublesome Night (1997)
Haunted Mansion (1998)
Troublesome Night 3 (1998)
Bullets Over Summer (1999)
Troublesome Night 5 (1999)
Troublesome Night 6 (1999)
Troublesome Night 7 (2000)
Troublesome Night 8 (2000)
Troublesome Night 9 (2001)
Troublesome Night 10 (2001)
Troublesome Night 11 (2001)
Troublesome Night 12 (2001)
Troublesome Night 13 (2002)
Troublesome Night 14 (2002)
Troublesome Night 15 (2002)
Troublesome Night 16 (2002)
Troublesome Night 17 (2002)
Troublesome Night 18 (2003)
Troublesome Night 19 (2003)
The Unusual Youth (2005)
Don't Open Your Eyes (2006)
Flash Point (2007)
The Haunting Lover (2010)
A Simple Life (2011)
Blue Magic (2013)
The White Storm (2013)
Overheard 3 (2014)
Flirting in the Air (2014)
Tales of Mystery (2015)
An Inspector Calls (2015)
Are You Here (2015)
Big Fortune Hotel (2015)
Heaven in the Dark (2016)
Cook Up a Storm (2017)
Always Be With You (2017)
Agent Mr Chan (2018)
A Beautiful Moment (2018)
Hotel Soul Good (2018)
I Love You, You're Perfect, Now Change! (2019)
Girl Dorm (2019)

Honours and awards
Medal of Honour (2002)

Hong Kong Film Critics Society Awards
Best Actress for Bullets Over Summer (2000)

Hong Kong Film Awards
Best Supporting Actress Nomination for Thou Shalt Not Swear (1994)
Best Supporting Actress Nomination for 13 July (1997)
Best Actress for Bullets Over Summer (2000)

Golden Bauhinia Awards
Best Supporting Actress for Bullets Over Summer (2000)

TVB Anniversary Awards
Life Achievement Award (2002)

References

External links

1934 births
Hong Kong Roman Catholics
TVB actors
Hong Kong television actresses
Living people
20th-century Hong Kong actresses
21st-century Hong Kong actresses
Hong Kong film actresses